Russia participated in the Eurovision Song Contest 2012 in Baku, Azerbaijan. The Russian entry was selected through a national final, organised by the Russian broadcaster RTR. Buranovskiye Babushki represented Russia with the song "Party for Everybody", which qualified from the first semi-final and went on to place 2nd in the final, scoring 259 points.

Before Eurovision

Evrovidenie 2012 

Evrovidenie 2012 was the seventh edition of Evrovidenie, the music competition that selects Russia's entry for the Eurovision Song Contest. The show took place on 7 March 2012 at the Akademicheskiy Concert Hall in Moscow and hosted by Olga Shelest and Mikhail Zelenskiy. Twenty-five artists and songs participated and the winner was selected through a jury and a public televote. The show was broadcast on Russia-1, RTR-Planeta as well as online via the broadcaster's website vesti.ru and the official Eurovision Song Contest website eurovision.tv.

Competing entries 
On 28 December 2011, RTR announced a submission period for interested artists and composers to submit their entries until 10 February 2012. The broadcaster received 150 submissions at the conclusion of the deadline. Between 35 and 40 entries were selected from the received submissions to proceed to auditions held on 29 February 2012 where a jury panel selected the twenty-five finalists for the national final. The competing acts were announced on 1 March 2012 and among the competing artists were Eurovision Song Contest 2008 winner Dima Bilan, 2003 Russian Eurovision entrant as part of T.A.T.u. Julia Volkova, and 2006 Belarusian Eurovision entrant Polina Smolova.

Final 
The final took place on 7 March 2012. Twenty-five entries competed and the winner, "Party for Everybody" performed by Buranovskiye Babushki, was determined through a 50/50 combination of votes from a jury panel and public televoting. The jury consisted of Sergey Arhipov (deputy director of Radio Mayak), Igor Krutoy (composer), Alexander Igudin (director and producer), Philipp Kirkorov (1995 Russian Eurovision entrant), Arman Davletyarov (media manager), Roman Emelyanov (program director of Russkoye Radio) and Gennady Gokhshtein (executive entertainment producer of Russia-1). In addition to the performances of the competing entries, 2009 and 2011 Russian Junior Eurovision entrant Katya Ryabova and 2008 Ukrainian Eurovision entrant Ani Lorak performed as guests.

At Eurovision 
Russia competed in the second half of the first semi-final (14th on stage), on 22 May 2012, following Denmark and preceding Hungary. Buranovskiye Babushki received 152 points and placed 1st, thus qualifying for the final on 26 May. The public awarded Russia 1st place with 189 points and the jury awarded 8th place with 75 points.

In the final, Russia was drawn to perform 6th, after Bosnia and Herzegovina and preceding Iceland. The Russian entry scored a total of 259 points and placed 2nd in the final. The public awarded Russia 2nd place with 332 points and the jury awarded 11th place with 94 points.

Voting

Points awarded to Russia

Points awarded by Russia

References 

2012
Countries in the Eurovision Song Contest 2012
Eurovision